Laurier is an unincorporated urban community in the Rural Municipality of Ste. Rose, Manitoba, Canada. Rose du Lac to the north.

The community is recognized as a designated place by Statistics Canada.

History 
Laurier was identified as a railway point on a map in 1896 with the Canadian National Railway arriving the following year. The post office was opened as Fosbery and changed to Laurier in 1897 in honour of Sir Wilfrid Laurier, the Prime Minister of Canada at that time.

Demographics 

See also 
List of designated places in Manitoba

References 

Unincorporated urban communities in Manitoba
Unincorporated communities in Parkland Region, Manitoba
Designated places in Manitoba
Manitoba communities with majority francophone populations